"Heart on Fire" is a song by British singer and songwriter Indiana. The song was released in the United Kingdom on 24 August 2014 as a digital download from her debut studio album No Romeo (2015). The song has peaked at number 89 on the UK Singles Chart.

Music video
A music video to accompany the release of "Heart on Fire" was first released onto YouTube on 7 July 2014 at a total length of four minutes and nine seconds.

Track listing

Chart performance

Weekly charts

Release history

References

2014 singles
Indiana (singer) songs
2014 songs
Sony Music singles
Songs written by Two Inch Punch